The rusty-capped fulvetta (Schoeniparus dubius) is a species of bird in the family Pellorneidae. It is found in Bhutan, China, India, Laos, Myanmar, and Vietnam. Its natural habitat is subtropical or tropical moist montane forest.

References

Collar, N. J. & Robson, C. 2007. Family Timaliidae (Babblers)  pp. 70 – 291 in; del Hoyo, J., Elliott, A. & Christie, D.A. eds. Handbook of the Birds of the World, Vol. 12. Picathartes to Tits and Chickadees. Lynx Edicions, Barcelona.

rusty-capped fulvetta
Birds of Bhutan
Birds of Northeast India
Birds of South China
Birds of Laos
Birds of Myanmar
Birds of Vietnam
Birds of Yunnan
rusty-capped fulvetta
Taxonomy articles created by Polbot